Faisal Zakaria (born 8 November 1973) is a Sudanese kickboxer, fighting out of Auckland, New Zealand. He was WBC International Muay Thai Heavyweight Champion.

Biography and career 
Faisal Zakaria was born and raised in Sudan. He started to train in karate and represented his country in international competition. In 1990, he left Sudan after political unrest and created a karate school in Libya with other Sudanese expats and trained and tutored in Syria, Greece, Turkey and Lebanon. It was in Lebanon that Zakaria was introduced to Muay Thai.

Faisal Zakaria went to Thailand and within six months was fighting professionally and building a strong following with his entertaining style. Zakaria holds notable victories over Eh Phoutong, Ricardo van den Bos and Saksit.

Titles
 2010 WBC Muaythai International Heavyweight Champion
 2002 CBA International Champion

Kickboxing record 

|-  style="background:#fbb;"
| 2016-04-23 || Loss ||align=left| Asihati || Kunlun Fight 43 || Zhoukou, China || TKO  || 2 ||  
|-
|-  bgcolor="#CCFFCC"
| 2016-03-22 || Win ||align=left| Steve Banks || Super Muaythai || China || Decision || 3 || 3:00
|-
|-  bgcolor="#CCFFCC"
| 2015-11 || Win ||align=left| Yak Nonaskin || Super Muaythai || Bangkok, Thailand || KO ||  || 
|-
|-  style="background:#fbb;"
| 2013-11-11 || Loss ||align=left| Tafa Misipati  || The King in the Ring 7|| Auckland, New Zealand || Decision (Unanimous) || 3 || 3:00
|-  style="background:#fbb;"
| 2013-07-13 || Loss ||align=left| Antz Nansen  || The King in the Ring 7|| Auckland, New Zealand || TKO (corner stoppage) || 3 || 
|-  style="background:#fbb;"
| 2010-09-03 || Loss ||align=left| Andrew Peck || Universal Soldier|| Auckland, New Zealand || KO || 4 || 0:45
|-
! style=background:white colspan=9 |
|-
|-  style="background:#fbb;"
| 2010-07-10 || Loss ||align=left| Ben Edwards || K-1 World Grand Prix 2010 in Canberra, Quarter Final || Canberra, Australia || KO (Left hook) || 1 || 1:03
|-  bgcolor="#CCFFCC"
| 2010-01-02 || Win ||align=left| Ricardo van den Bos || Battle at the Beach Show || Pattaya, Thailand || Decision (2-1) || 5 || 3:00
|-
! style=background:white colspan=9 |
|-
|-  style="background:#fbb;"
| 2009-08-28 || Loss ||align=left| Andre Meunier || Knees of Fury 26 || Adelaide, Australia || KO (Uppercut) || 3 ||  
|-  style="background:#fbb;"
| 2009 || Loss ||align=left| ||  || Japan ||  ||  ||  
|-  bgcolor="#CCFFCC"
| 2009 || Win ||align=left| || || Japan || TKO ||  || 
|-  style="background:#fbb;"
| 2009-05-30 || Loss ||align=left| Mehmet Ozer || The Challenger 2009 || Macau, China || KO (Spinning back high kick) ||  || 
|-  bgcolor="#CCFFCC"
| 2009-05-30 || Win ||align=left| Eduardo Maiorino || The Challenger 2009 || Macau, China || KO (Knee strike) ||  || 
|-  style="background:#fbb;"
| 2009 || Loss ||align=left| ||  || China ||  ||  ||  
|-  bgcolor="#CCFFCC"
| 2008 || Win ||align=left| Fred || || Okinawa, Japan || Decision ||  || 
|-  style="background:#fbb;"
| 2008 || Loss ||align=left| ||  || Tokyo, Japan ||  ||  ||  
|-  style="background:#fbb;"
| 2007-09-16 || Loss ||align=left| Nobu Hayashi || TITANS NEOS II || Tokyo, Japan || Decision (2-0) || 3 || 3:00 
|-  style="background:#fbb;"
|-  bgcolor="#CCFFCC"
| 2007 || Win ||align=left| Abus || || Iran || Decision || 5 || 3:00 
|-  style="background:#fbb;"
| 2007-07-28 || Loss ||align=left| Paul Slowinski || Fists of Fury || Singapore || TKO (Low kick) || 4 || 0:08
|-
! style=background:white colspan=9 |
|-  bgcolor="#CCFFCC"
| 2007-03-24 || Win ||align=left| Terry Tutere || Who's the man! || Auckland, New Zealand || Decision || 5 || 3:00
|-  bgcolor="#c5d2ea"
| 2006-12-04 || Draw ||align=left| Mohammed Oudris || King's Birthday 2006 || Bangkok, Thailand || Decision Draw || 5 || 3:00
|-  bgcolor="#CCFFCC"
| 2006 || Win ||align=left| Andreas ||  || New Zealand || Decision ||5 || 3:00
|-  bgcolor="#CCFFCC"
| 2006 || Win ||align=left| John Gallia ||  || New Zealand || Decision ||5 || 3:00
|-  bgcolor="#CCFFCC"
| 2005 || Win ||align=left| Simon Dome ||  || New Zealand || Decision || 5 || 3:00
|-  bgcolor="#CCFFCC"
| 2005 || Win ||align=left| Simon Dome ||  || New Zealand || Decision || 5 || 3:00
|-  bgcolor="#CCFFCC"
| 2005-11-18 || Win ||align=left| John Gallia || Lee Gar vs The World || Auckland, New Zealand || KO (Knee strike) || 2 || 
|-  bgcolor="#CCFFCC"
| 2005 || Win ||align=left| Vinnie Mahoney ||  || New Zealand || Decision || 5 || 3:00 
|-  bgcolor="#CCFFCC"
| 2004 || Win ||align=left| Saksit || Rajadamnern Stadium || Bangkok, Thailand || Decision || 5 || 3:00 
|-  bgcolor="#CCFFCC"
| 2004 || Win ||align=left| Alex Ricci ||  || Thailand || Decision || 5 || 3:00  
|-
! style=background:white colspan=9 |
|-  bgcolor="#CCFFCC"
| 2004 || Win ||align=left| Painiran Asani ||  || Thailand || Decision || 5 || 3:00
|-  style="background:#fbb;"
| 2003-11-19 || Loss ||align=left| Magomed Magomedov  || Golden Panther Cup, Semi Finals || Moscow, Russia || Decision ||  ||   
|-  bgcolor="#CCFFCC"
| 2003-11-19 || Win ||align=left| || Golden Panther Cup, Quarter Finals || Moscow, Russia ||  ||  ||   
|-  bgcolor="#CCFFCC"
| 2003 || Win ||align=left| Painiran Asan ||  || Thailand || KO ||  || 
|-  style="background:#fbb;"
| 2003 || Loss ||align=left| Rob || Chaweng Stadium || Chaweng, Thailand || Decision ||  ||  
|-  bgcolor="#CCFFCC"
| 2003 || Win ||align=left| Neils Elkand ||  || Thailand || Decision || 5 || 3:00 
|-  style="background:#fbb;"
| 2003 || Loss ||align=left| Mohammed || King's Birthday 2003, Finals || Bangkok, Thailand || Decision ||  ||  
|-  bgcolor="#CCFFCC"
| 2003 || Win ||align=left| Andreas || King's Birthday 2003, Semi Finals || Bangkok, Thailand || Decision ||  ||  
|-  style="background:#fbb;"
| 2003-06-30 || Loss ||align=left| Lamsongkram Chuwattana || Rajadamnern Stadium || Bangkok, Thailand || Decision || 5 || 3:00
|-  style="background:#fbb;"
| 2003-05-26 || Loss ||align=left| Kaoklai Kaennorsing || Rajadamnern Stadium || Bangkok, Thailand || Decision || 5 || 3:00
|-  style="background:#fbb;"
| 2003|| Loss ||align=left| Eugene Ekleboom ||  || Thailand || Decision || 5 || 3:00
|-  bgcolor="#CCFFCC"
| 2003 || Win ||align=left| Mraztyl ||  || Abu Dhabi || KO ||  ||  
|-  bgcolor="#CCFFCC"
| 2003 || Win ||align=left|  ||  || Thailand || Decision || 5 || 3:00 
|-  style="background:#fbb;"
| 2003 || Loss ||align=left| Mot Eck Muangsemaa || || Thailand || Decision || 5 || 3:00 
|-  style="background:#fbb;"
| 2003-11 || Loss ||align=left| Eh Phoutong || Olympic Stadium || Cambodia || Decision || 5 || 3:00 
|-
! style=background:white colspan=9 |
|-  bgcolor="#CCFFCC"
| 2003 || Win ||align=left| Payak Sochionto ||  || Thailand || Decision || 5 || 3:00 
|-  bgcolor="#CCFFCC"
| 2002 || Win ||align=left| Saksit || Rajadamnern Stadium || Bangkok, Thailand || Decision || 5 || 3:00 
|-  bgcolor="#CCFFCC"
| 2002 || Win ||align=left| ||  || Hong Kong || Decision || 5 || 3:00
|-  style="background:#fbb;"
| 2002-12-05 || Loss ||align=left| Ole Laursen || King's Birthday 2002, Final || Bangkok, Thailand || KO || 2 || 
|-
! style=background:white colspan=9 |
|-
|-  bgcolor="#CCFFCC"
| 2002-12-05 || Win ||align=left| Nuno Martin || King's Birthday 2002, Semi Finals || Bangkok, Thailand ||  ||  || 
|-
|-  style="background:#fbb;"
| 2002 || Loss ||align=left| Saksit || || Thailand || Decision || 5 || 3:00 
|-  bgcolor="#CCFFCC"
| 2002 || Win ||align=left| Noiya ||  || Thailand || Decision || 5 || 3:00
|-  bgcolor="#CCFFCC"
| 2002-10 || Win ||align=left| Eh Phoutong || Borei Keila Stadium || Phnom Penh, Cambodia || Decision || 5 || 3:00
|-
! style=background:white colspan=9 |
|-  bgcolor="#CCFFCC"
| 2002 || Win ||align=left| Nokweed Devy || Chaweng Stadium || Chaweng, Thailand || Decision || 5 || 3:00
|-  bgcolor="#CCFFCC"
| 2002 || Win ||align=left| Yoddecha Sityodthong ||  || Thailand || KO ||  || 
|-  style="background:#fbb;"
| 2001-12-23 || Loss ||align=left| Paul Slowinski || || Bangkok, Thailand || TKO (Low kick) || 3 || 
|-
! style=background:white colspan=9 |
|-  style="background:#fbb;"
| 2001-09-08 || Loss ||align=left| Sun Tao || China vs Thailand  || Beijing, China || Decision || 3 || 3:00 
|-  bgcolor="#c5d2ea"
| 2001 || Draw ||align=left| Eh Phoutong ||   || Cambodia || Decision Draw || 5 || 3:00
|-  style="background:#fbb;"
| 2001 || Loss ||align=left| Yohan  || Chaweng Stadium || Chaweng, Thailand || Decision || 5 || 3:00
|-
! style=background:white colspan=9 |
|-  bgcolor="#CCFFCC"
| 2001 || Win ||align=left| Mot Eck Muangsemaa ||  || Pattaya, Thailand || Decision || 5 || 3:00
|-  bgcolor="#CCFFCC"
| 2001 || Win ||align=left| Caulan || Rajadamnern Stadium || Thailand || Decision || 5 || 3:00
|-  bgcolor="#c5d2ea"
| 2000 || Draw ||align=left| ||   || China || Decision Draw || 5 || 3:00
|-  bgcolor="#CCFFCC"
| 2000 || Win ||align=left| Sammat ||   || Thailand || Decision || 5 || 3:00
|-  bgcolor="#CCFFCC"
| 1998 || Win ||align=left| ||   || Libanon || KO ||  || 
|-
| colspan=9 | Legend:

References

External links
http://www.stuff.co.nz/auckland/local-news/western-leader/4684708/Champ-moves-to-Ranui

Living people
Sudanese male kickboxers
Heavyweight kickboxers
1973 births
Kunlun Fight kickboxers